

Siegmund Freiherr von Schleinitz (23 July 1890 – 30 November 1968) was a German general in the Wehrmacht during World War II. He was a recipient of the Knight's Cross of the Iron Cross of Nazi Germany.

Schleinitz surrendered to the Red Army in the course of the Soviet 1945 East Pomeranian Offensive. Convicted as a war criminal in the Soviet Union, he was held until 1955.

Awards 

 German Cross in Gold (26 December 1941)
 Knight's Cross of the Iron Cross on 14 August 1943 as Generalleutnant and commander of 9th Infantry Division

References

Citations

Bibliography

 

1890 births
1968 deaths
Lieutenant generals of the German Army (Wehrmacht)
Barons of Germany
German Army personnel of World War I
Prussian Army personnel
Recipients of the clasp to the Iron Cross, 1st class
Recipients of the Gold German Cross
Recipients of the Knight's Cross of the Iron Cross
Military personnel from Berlin
German prisoners of war in World War II held by the Soviet Union
Reichswehr personnel
People from the Province of Brandenburg
German Army generals of World War II